Forrest School is a public school in Chapel Hill, Tennessee. It serves grades 7-12 and is part of the Marshall County School District. The school is also known as Forrest Middle School for grades 7-8 and Forrest High School for grades 9-12. It is named for Nathan Bedford Forrest, a Confederate general, known for his outstanding military leadership in the cavalry, the massacre of African American Union troops stationed at Fort Pillow, and for being the first Grand Wizard of the KKK.

History
Forrest School was a K-12 school until Chapel Hill Elementary School was established to serve grades K-5.

Forrest has gone through several building additions since it was established. The latest was in 2007 which included additional classrooms, a band room, and a football stadium.

Athletics 

Forrest High School competes in TSSAA's Division 1, Class A.

Boys
Baseball
Basketball
Cross Country
Football
Golf
Soccer
Wrestling

Girls
Basketball
Cheerleading
Cross Country
Golf
Soccer
Softball

State Championships
1998 TSSAA Class A Cheerleading Non-Building
2006 TSSAA Class A Cheerleading Non-Building
2006 TSSAA Class A Girls Basketball
2008 TSSAA Class A Girls Softball
2015 TSSAA Class A Girls Softball

State Honors
2010 TSSAA Class A Tennessee Miss Basketball - Beth Hawn

Band
2007 Division 1 State Marching Band Champions

Clubs
Art Club
Beta Club
Drama Club
FBLA
FCA
FCCLA
FFA
Leo Club
Student Council
Hosa

Notable alumni
Mike Minor - Professional baseball player with the Texas Rangers

References

External links 
Forrest School website
Marshall County School System

Schools in Marshall County, Tennessee
Public high schools in Tennessee
Public middle schools in Tennessee
Nathan Bedford Forrest